Anne Marie Bates Clarke is an American-born British Labour Party politician who has been the London Assembly Member for Barnet and Camden since 2021. She represented Childs Hill on Barnet Council from 2018 to 2022, and has represented Cricklewood since 2022. Clarke is a school governor at Hampstead School and is an active member of the Cricklewood Town team.

Early and personal life
Clarke is from Winnetka, Illinois, a suburb north of Chicago in the United States. She studied at the University of Wisconsin-Oshkosh and was a member of Alpha Xi Delta. Having moved to London to study in 1998, she became a naturalised British citizen in 2007. She lives in Cricklewood with her husband and two children.

References 

Living people
American emigrants to England
Councillors in the London Borough of Barnet
Labour Members of the London Assembly
Labour Party (UK) councillors
Naturalised citizens of the United Kingdom
People from Winnetka, Illinois
School governors
University of Wisconsin–Oshkosh alumni
Year of birth missing (living people)
Women councillors in England